Nurobod is an urban-type settlement in Tashkent Region, Uzbekistan. It is part of the city of Angren. The town's population in 2003 was 6500 people.

References

Populated places in Tashkent Region
Urban-type settlements in Uzbekistan